Yana Krasimirova Yordanova (born 20 February 2003) is a Bulgarian footballer who plays as a midfielder for Middle Tennessee State University  and the Bulgaria women's national team.

Club career
Yordanova has played for NSA Sofia in Bulgaria.

Now she is playing for Middle Tennessee State University in D1 Level

International career
Yordanova represented Bulgaria at the 2019 UEFA Women's Under-17 Championship and the 2020 UEFA Women's Under-17 Championship as a captain. qualification. She made her senior debut on 11 June 2021 in a 0–1 friendly home loss to Bosnia and Herzegovina.

References

External links

2003 births
Living people
Bulgarian women's footballers
Women's association football midfielders
FC NSA Sofia players
Bulgaria women's international footballers
21st-century Bulgarian women